Xinyang Township is a rural township in Liling City, Zhuzhou City, Hunan Province, People's Republic of China.

Cityscape
The township is divided into 10 villages, the following areas: Chenjiawan Community, Qingni Village, Yuliangqiao Village, Shiyang Village, Hutan Village, Huaqiao Village, Hetang Village, Nanzhushan Village, Xinyang Village, and Jiangjun Village (陈家湾村、青泥村、鱼梁桥村、石羊村、湖潭村、花桥村、荷塘村、楠竹山村、新阳村、将军村).

Historic township-level divisions of Liling